Bull River may be:

Bull River (British Columbia) in British Columbia, Canada
Bull River (Georgia) in Georgia, U.S.
Bull River (Montana) in Montana, U.S.
Bull River (West Virginia) in West Virginia, U.S.
Bull River (California) in California, U.S.